Greg or Gregory Foster may refer to:

Greg Foster (basketball) (born 1968), American retired professional basketball player
Greg Foster (hurdler) (1958–2023), American hurdler
Greg Foster (The Young and the Restless), character on the soap opera The Young and the Restless
Sir Gregory Foster (1866–1931), British university administrator
 Greg Foster, founder and CEO of Rainbow Play Systems